The first New Zealand Coastal Policy Statement (NZCPS) was released in 1994 and replaced in 2010. The NZCPS is a requirement under Section 56 of the Resource Management Act 1991.

See also
Environment of New Zealand

Further reading

External links
New Zealand Coastal Policy Statement at the Department of Conservation

Coastline of New Zealand
Environmental policy in New Zealand